The Children's Healthcare of Atlanta - Egleston Hospital is a nationally ranked, freestanding, 295-bed, pediatric acute care children's hospital located in Atlanta, Georgia. It is affiliated with the Emory University School of Medicine and is a member of the Children's Healthcare of Atlanta system, 1 of 3 of the children's hospitals in the system. The hospital provides comprehensive pediatric specialties and subspecialties to infants, children, teens, and young adults aged 0–21 throughout the Atlanta region. The hospital features an ACS verified level I pediatric trauma center, the only in the state. Its regional pediatric intensive-care unit and neonatal intensive care units serve the region. The hospital also has a rooftop helipad for critical pediatric transport.

The hospital is scheduled to be replaced in 2025 by the under-construction Arthur M. Blank Hospital in the North Druid Hills region of Atlanta.

History 
In 1928, Henrietta Egleston Hospital for Children opened in the Old Fourth Ward east of downtown Atlanta at 640 Forrest Avenue (now Ralph McGill Blvd.). It opened with the financial support of Thomas R. Egleston Jr.  In the first year the 52-bed facility was open, 605 children were treated. The original hospital site was on the north side of Forrest Avenue (now Ralph McGill Blvd.) on the east side of Fortune St. (today Wabash Ave.). Today the AMLI Parkside apartments occupy the site.

The hospital contained the original Dolly Blalock Black Memorial Garden, dedicated to Elizabeth "Dolly" Blalock, wife of Eugene R. Black, Sr., president of the World Bank.

In the 1950s Egleston became the pediatric teaching hospital affiliate for the Emory University School of Medicine, and in 1959 relocated to the university's campus. A prominent local and women's rights activist Ella Lillian Wall Van Leer played an important role at the hospital as its trustee, President of the Auxiliary department and Director of Volunteers until 1976.

In 1959 the Atlanta Housing Authority purchased the Forrest Avenue site and planned a 350-unit complex there, which Black groups had argued for to relieve overcrowding in the Sweet Auburn area to the west. White homeowners complained that this would mean Black encroachment eastwards, and so City Council aldermen refused rezone the site, offering instead to clean up the Buttermilk Bottom slum.

In 1987 the hospital opens a medical-psychiatric unit. Today the unit is one of only six university-affiliated units especially for children in the United States.

The hospital is now a part of Children's Healthcare of Atlanta (CHOA). CHOA formed in 1998 when Egleston Children's Health Care System and Scottish Rite Medical Center came together, becoming one of the largest pediatric systems in the United States.

The City of Atlanta annexed the hospital site effective January 1, 2018. The health system had requested that the Atlanta city government annex the area including Egleston Hospital. Previously the headquarters were in an unincorporated area, statistically counted in the Druid Hills census-designated place.

Currently, a new CHOA hospital is under construction in the North Druid Hills area. The new hospital will be named the Arthur M. Blank Hospital and will replace Egleston Hospital when opened in 2025. The future of Egleston is unknown after the opening of the new hospital.

Awards 
As of 2021, Children's Healthcare of Atlanta has placed nationally in all 10 ranked pediatric specialties on U.S. News & World Report.

See also 

 List of children's hospitals in the United States
 Arthur M. Blank Hospital
 Emory University School of Medicine
 Scottish Rite Medical Center
 Hughes Spalding Children's Hospital

References

Hospitals in Atlanta

Hospitals established in 1928
Children's hospitals in the United States
Old Fourth Ward
1928 establishments in Georgia (U.S. state)
Egleston
Pediatric trauma centers